FabricLive.57 is a DJ album by Jackmaster. It was released in 2011 as part of the FabricLive Mix Series.

Track listing
  The Fantastic Aleems - Release Yourself - NIA
  Inner City - Big Fun (Magic Juan Remix) - Virgin
  Gregor Salto - Classic Beat Tool - G-REX
  Model 500 - Night Drive (Thru-Babylon) - Metroplex
  Kim English - Nite Life (Armand's Retail Mix) - Nervous
  Anthony Shakir - Plugged In - Rush Hour
  Martyn - Alldayallnight - 3024
  Geiom feat. Terrible Shock - 2 4 6 - unreleased
  Doug Willis - Dougswana (Audiowhores Beats) - Z
  Jook10 - Emotions - Soulserious
  Larry Heard pres. Mr. White - The Sun Can't Compare - Alleviated
  Addison Groove - Make Um Bounce - Tectonic
  Sinden & SBTRKT - Seekwal - Grizzly
  Splack Pack - Shake That Ass Bitch - Pandisc
  Davina - Don't You Want It - Happy
  Sia - Little Man (Wookie Remix) - Long Lost Brother
  CLS - Can You Feel It? (In House Dub) - Strictly Rhythm
  DJ Deeon - The Freaks - Juke Trax
  The Outlander - Vamp - R&S
  Splack Pack - Scrub Da Ground - Pandisc
  UR - Jupiter Jazz - Underground Resistance
  Thomas Bangalter - What To Do - Roulé
  Fix - Flash - NightVision
  Hudson Mohawke - Fuse - Warp
  Machinedrum - La Bomba - unreleased
  DJ Funk - Pussy Ride - Funk
  AFX - VBS Redlot B - Rephlex
  Skepta - Doin' It Again - Boy Better Know
  Radiohead - Idioteque - EMI

References

External links
Fabric: FabricLive.56

Fabric (club) albums
2011 compilation albums